Karl-Josef Kutsch, also known as K. J. Kutsch, (born 11 May 1924) is a German physician and co-author with Leo Riemens of the Großes Sängerlexikon, the standard reference for opera singers.

Life and work 
Born in Gangelt, Kutsch studied medicine, was drafted and participated as a soldier in the Russia campaign of the Second World War. He then completed his studies at the Goethe University Frankfurt in 1948. He practised as a physician from 1952 to 1989 in his hometown, together with his wife.

From the 1950s, Kutsch built a collection of records and singers' biographies. Together with the Dutch musicologist Leo Riemens, he published a small biographical dictionary of singers in 1962 under the title Unvergängliche Stimmen (Immortal Voices). In 1975 the work was revised as Unvergängliche Stimmen / Sängerlexikon, which was again revised in 1985 with his and Riemens' cooperation and became the standard work. Under the title Großes Sängerlexikon (Great Singers' Lexicon), it was substantially expanded with the collaboration of Hansjörg Rost and in the current edition comprises seven volumes with detailed biographies of 18,760 singers from the Renaissance to the present day. The biographies mention the subject's name, a possible stage name, the dates and place of birth and death as well as the voice category and give an overview of the career – according to places of activity and works that were sung and played. In addition, the biographies contain brief mentions of important milestones, a description of the voice, as well as bibliographical references and major recordings made if any. The fourth edition of the Biographical Dictionary of Singers, in seven volumes, was reissued in 2012 as an anniversary edition (Jubiläumsausgabe), with now 18,760 entries. It is regarded as the standard reference in the field. The information is regarded as valuable not only for opera but also for general historic and sociological studies.

Publications 
 Der Gesundheitszustand der Schulkinder im Kreise Geilenkirchen-Heinsberg im Schuljahr 1946–1947, University thesis 1948
 with Leo Riemens: Großes Sängerlexikon. Since 1962 this work has known several and revised editions:
 4th, extended and updated edition. 7 volumes (Aarden-Castles; Castori-Frampoli; Franc-Kaidanoff; Kainz-Menkes; Menni-Rappold; Rasa-Sutton; Suvanny-Zysset). Printed edition with e-book. Saur, Munich 2003,  (taken over later by Walter de Gruyter, Berlin), LIX,

References

External links 
  
 
 Dr. Kutsch-Straße strassenkatalog.de

1924 births
Living people
Physicians from North Rhine-Westphalia
German music journalists
20th-century German musicologists
People from Heinsberg (district)